The Cleveland crime family or Cleveland Mafia is the collective name given to a succession of Italian-American organized crime gangs based in Cleveland, Ohio, in the United States. A part of the Italian-American Mafia (or Cosa Nostra) phenomenon, it operates in the Greater Cleveland area. Founded about 1920, leadership turned over frequently due to a series of power grabs and assassinations. Stability emerged in 1930 after Frank Milano became boss. The organization underwent significant decline in the last years of boss John T. Scalish. During the late 1970s, violent gang war erupted in the streets of Cleveland after Irish mobster Danny Greene attempted to take over the city. The war drew significant law enforcement attention reducing membership and influence of the Cleveland family. The crime family nearly ceased to exist in the 1990s, after many high-ranking members were imprisoned. The organization is believed by law enforcement to be extremely small in the 21st century, although attempting to rebuild.

History

Early organized crime in Cleveland
Semi-organized Sicilian American- and Italian American-run "Black Hand" extortion rackets first emerged in Cleveland about 1900. The Cleveland Division of Police soon established an "Italian squad" (also known as the "Black Hand squad") to deal with the problem. After a series of Black Hand-related murders in the city in 1906, this police unit largely suppressed this first expression of organized crime in Cleveland.

Loosely organized gangs emerged in the 1910s. An Italian American gang known as the Mayfield Road Mob formed in Cleveland's Little Italy neighborhood about 1913. At roughly the same time, another Italian American gang, the Collinwood Crew, formed in the Collinwood neighborhood. This gang centered its activities around the intersection of St. Clair Avenue, E. 152d Street, and Ivanhoe Road. Out of a drug store in Cleveland's Big Italy neighborhood, notary public Angelo Serra ran the "Serra Gang". It was primarily an automobile theft ring which relied on Serra to forge titles to the cars and create fake vehicle registration plates. At one point in the mid-1910s, it did $500,000 ($ in  dollars) a year in vehicle thefts. The gang also engaged in other crimes such as extortion, illegal gambling, the numbers racket, and robbery. In the late 1910s, the "Benigno Gang" formed under Dominic Benigno in Little Italy. The gang specialized in payroll robberies, and in 1919 and 1920 monopolized payroll robberies by intimidating or murdering anyone who tried to pull off a heist without Benigno's permission. A less organized and more fluid criminal organization was the "reservoir gang", a group of criminals engaged in armed robbery, automobile theft, burglary, and other property crimes which met at Cleveland's Baldwin Water Treatment Plant reservoir in order to plan crimes, exchange stolen goods, and disperse profits from crime.

Prohibition began in Ohio on May 27, 1919, and nationally throughout the United States on January 16, 1920. Many small, organized gangs emerged between 1919 and 1921 to circumvent the liquor law by importing liquor from Canada, diverting alcohol from legitimate purposes (such as medicine and industry), and distilling and distributing home-brewed beer and liquor. Small bootlegging operations were run by formerly legitimate businessmen like Michelino Le Paglia, August L. Rini, and Louis Rosen. A number of small bootleg gangs, run by Jewish residents, began operating in the "Little Hollywood" area of the Hough neighborhood, an area bounded by Lexington and Hough Avenues between E. 73rd and E. 79th Streets. The brothels, gambling halls, and speakeasies of Little Hollywood became the favorite place to relax for small gang leaders throughout Cleveland, many of whom established their offices in the tiny red-light district. Larger organizations included an Italian American gang centered on Woodland Avenue and E. 55th Street, and an Italian American gang centered on Woodland and E. 105th Street. The Mayfield Road Mob also grew larger as it focused more on bootlegging.

The Lonardo and Porrello brothers

The four Lonardo brothers (Joseph, Frank, John, and Dominic) and seven Porrello brothers, including Joseph Porello, immigrated to the United States from Licata, Sicily. The Lonardo and Porrello brothers first established themselves as legitimate businessmen. The two groups dabbled in various criminal activities including robbery and extortion, before prohibition, but were not yet considered a major organization.

At the start of Prohibition, Joseph "Big Joe" Lonardo was the boss of the Cleveland crime family. He was the second oldest of the four Lonardo brothers. He and his brothers began by supplying Cleveland's bootleggers with the corn sugar they needed to produce liquor. His top lieutenant was Joseph Porrello, who supervised various bootlegging and other criminal operations throughout the early to mid-1920s.

Split factions (1926–1927)
In 1926, the Porrello brothers (Rosario, Vincenzo, Angelo, Joseph, John, Ottavio, and Raymond)  broke away from the Lonardo family and formed their own faction. They established their headquarters on upper Woodland Avenue, around E. 110th St. In 1927, hostilities between the Lonardo and Porrello families escalated as the families competed in the corn sugar business. During Prohibition, corn sugar was the prime ingredient in bootleg liquor.

In the summer of 1927, Joseph "Big Joe" Lonardo, boss of the Lonardo faction at the time, left for Sicily, Italy amongst rising tension between the two families. He left his brother John and adviser, Salvatore "Black Sam" Todaro as acting heads of the Cleveland family. When Lonardo returned, a sitdown was scheduled between the Lonardos and the Porrellos. On October 13, 1927, Joseph Lonardo and his eldest brother John were to meet with Angelo Porrello in a Porrello-owned barber shop. Inside the barbershop, when Joseph and John Lonardo relaxed into playing a game of cards, they were ambushed and killed by two Porrello gunmen. This allowed Joseph Porrello to take over as boss of the Cleveland crime family and become the most influential corn sugar baron in the Cleveland area.

The Porrellos (1927–1930)

Through late 1927 and much of 1928, the remaining Lonardo faction loyalists, which included an up-and-coming Mafia group known as the Mayfield Road Mob (led by Frank Milano) and various Jewish allies within the Cleveland Syndicate, continued to rival the Porrello family for the leadership within the Cleveland underworld. They vied for control of the most lucrative rackets outside of the corn sugar business, which included gambling, the most profitable hustle for American Mafia crime families after bootlegging.

To establish dominance, the Porrellos needed backing from the top Mafia bosses in New York, as well as other leading Mafia families across the United States. On December 5, 1928, a high-level American Mafia meeting was held at the Statler Hotel in Cleveland. Joseph Porrello, with the help of one of his top lieutenants Sam Tilocco, hosted the event in hopes that the top Mafia bosses from across the United States would declare him the official Mafia boss of Cleveland.

The attendees of the Cleveland meeting became participants to one of the first known La Cosa Nostra summits in American history. Some of the powerful bosses who attended included Joe Profaci and Vincent Mangano of New York. However, the meeting turned into a fiasco as some of the well-known attendees were recognized by local law enforcement and arrested along with their associates. Meanwhile, Mafiosi continued to arrive from across the country for the Mafia summit.

The Porrello brothers arranged for their associates to be bailed out of jail. In spite of the chaos, Joseph Porrello was declared the boss and recognized nationwide as head of the Cleveland crime family. On June 11, 1929, Porrello family Lieutenant Sam Todaro was murdered. At the end of Prohibition, most of the Porrello brothers and their supporters had been killed or had sided with the Mayfield Road Mob.

On July 5, 1930, Joseph Porrello was invited to a sitdown with Frank Milano at the Milano-owned Venetian Restaurant. Gunfire erupted and boss Joseph Porrello and his underling were killed. Vincenzo "Jim" Porrello succeeded his brother as Cleveland Mafia boss. Three weeks after his brother's murder, Vincenzo was shot in the back of the head and murdered in a grocery store on East 110th Street and Woodland Avenue in an area considered a Porrello stronghold. Raymond Porrello declared revenge, and on August 15, 1930, an explosion leveled Raymond's home. He was not home at the time.

Mayfield Road Mob (1930–1944)

In the early 1930s, Frank Milano and the "Mayfield Road Mob" of Cleveland's Little Italy had replaced the Porrellos as the Cleveland area's premier Mafia group. The Mafia faction was even mentioned by its old name in the movie The Godfather Part II as the Lakeview Road Gang, as Lakeview Cemetery borders Mayfield Road Hill which marks the beginning of Little Italy in Cleveland. This area is also referred to as "Murray Hill" by locals. This Mafia family was formed in the late 1920s and was headed by Frank Milano.

In 1931, Milano joined the National Crime Syndicate, a network of powerful criminals from around the country, such as Charlie Luciano and Meyer Lansky. Milano was now the official boss of Cleveland crime family. By 1932, Milano had become one of the top American Mafia bosses in the country and a charter Commission member.

On February 25, 1932, Milano made sure the Porrello family and their gang were finished for good by having Raymond and Rosario Porrello, along with their bodyguard, Dominic Gueli, murdered in a smoke shop on East 110th Street and Woodland Ave. in their old territory while they were playing cards. After this, the remaining Porrello brothers backed out of the Cleveland underworld and fled the area.

In 1935 Milano fled to Mexico after being indicted for tax evasion. Alfred Polizzi, another leading member of the Mayfield Road mob, seized power and reigned as boss until 1944 when he was convicted of tax evasion.

Collinwood Crew
The Collinwood Mob, also known as the Young Turks, was based in Cleveland's South Collinwood Neighborhood, was at times integrated with the Mayfield Road Mob and has a Mafia history as old as that of the Mayfield Road Gang. The most notorious of the Collinwood Crew was the late Alfred "Allie Con" Calabrese. Allie Con was feared and respected in both neighborhoods and known as a stand-up guy, a "true gangster". His crew consisted of Joe "Joey Loose" Lacobacci, the late Butchie Cisternino and others from an area that stretched from the 152nd Street bridge, up Five Points and Ivanhoe Road, down Mandalay across London Road to Wayside and over to Saranac bordering the Collinwood Train Yards.

Scalish era (1944–1976)
John Scalish held the longest reign of any Cleveland mob boss. He took control of the family in 1944, and remained the boss for thirty-two years, until his death in 1976. During his time as the crime family's leader, the group developed ties with important crime figures like Shondor Birns, Moe Dalitz, Meyer Lansky, and Tony Accardo. The Family also became allies of the extremely powerful Chicago Outfit and Genovese crime family. Additionally, The Cleveland mob also expanded its influence to areas throughout the Midwest, as well as California, Florida, and Las Vegas.

In the 1950s, the family reached its peak in size, with about 60 "made" members, and several times as many associates. By the 1970s the family's membership began to decrease because Scalish didn't induct many new members. Scalish died during open heart surgery in 1976 and failed to name a successor beforehand.

War with Danny Greene and decline (1976–1990s)

After the Death of John Scalish, it was decided by the family's members that James "Jack White" Licavoli would take over as boss. Licavoli worked for the infamous Purple Gang in Detroit during Prohibition before moving to Cleveland, where he gradually rose up the ranks of the city's underworld.

During his reign, an Irish gangster named Danny Greene began competing with the Mafia for control of rackets. This resulted in a violent mob war between the Mafia and the Danny Greene gang, during which there were almost 40 car bombings in Cleveland. This time period earned Cleveland the unofficial title of "Bomb City U.S.A.". Danny was backed by mob associate and teamster John Nardi, who was killed on May 17, 1977, by a car bomb in the parking lot of the Teamster Hall in Cleveland.

After several failed attempts to kill Greene, it became evident that Licavoli's outfit needed outside help. In 1977, Danny Greene was murdered after a scheduled visit to his dentist. After learning of the dentist appointment scheduled by Greene, Licavoli and Lonardo contracted Ray Ferritto to assassinate him. While Greene was in the dentist's office, a bomb was placed underneath a car adjacent to his. Upon return to his vehicle the bomb was exploded remotely. Greene lay under the ruins of his vehicle for at least an hour before his corpse was removed. After Greene's assassination, Ferritto heard that the Cleveland Crime Family wanted him dead and in response became an FBI informant. The information that he provided led to the arrests of many high ranking mafia members, including Jack Licavoli himself.

Eventually, Licavoli was sent to prison for the murder of Danny Greene in 1982. Angelo Lonardo, the son of Prohibition mob boss Joseph Lonardo, took control of the Cleveland crime family. He led the family until 1984 when he was convicted of running a drug ring and was sentenced to life in prison. He then became an informant, making him the highest-ranking Mafia turncoat up to that time. He informed on powerful Mafiosi from numerous families while in prison, and caused serious damage to the Mafia's infrastructure.

After Lonardo became an informant, the Cleveland crime family's boss was John "Peanuts" Tronolone. Peanuts was a long-time Miami Beach resident who prior to becoming the boss, was a South Florida point man for the New York-based Genovese crime family and other mobsters. He was also closely associated with Meyer Lansky. In 1989 he became the only Mafia boss to have the distinction of being arrested in a hand-to-hand undercover transaction by local law enforcement. He accepted jewelry from Dave Green, an undercover Broward County deputy in exchange for bookmaking and loan-sharking debts. He died before he could start his nine-year state prison sentence.

In 1978, Cleveland police warned then-mayor Dennis Kucinich that local Mafia members had put out a hit on him because of some of his mayoral initiatives were hindering money-making opportunities. Police told Kucinich that a hitman was planning on shooting the mayor while he marched in The Columbus Day Parade in October 1978. Kucinich missed the parade as he was hospitalized with a ruptured ulcer.  However, he took note of the threat and began keeping a gun in his home for protection.

The Cleveland Mafia was dismantled by the FBI and other law enforcement officials so aggressively in the 1980s that by 1990 the family only had a few made members left in the street. According to the FBI the Cleveland Mafia started to slowly rebuild the organization by making new members in the late 1990s and all of the 2000s.

Historical leadership

Boss (official and acting)
1920–1927 – Joseph "Big Joe" Lonardo – murdered in 1927.
1927–1929 – Salvatore "Black Sam" Todaro – murdered in 1929.
1929–1930 – Joseph "Big Joe" Porrello – murdered in 1930.
1930–1935 – Frank Milano – fled to Mexico in 1935, moved to California in the late 1950s; died of natural causes in 1970.
1935–1945 – Alfred "Big Al" Polizzi – arrested in 1944, retired to Florida in 1945, died of natural causes in 1975.
Acting 1944–1945 – John T. "John Scalise" Scalish - died of complications during heart surgery in 1976.
1945–1976 – John T. "John Scalise" Scalish
1976–1985 – James "Jack White" Licavoli – imprisoned in 1981, died of natural causes in 1985.
Acting 1981–1983 – Angelo "Big Ange" Lonardo – turned informant in October 1983, died of natural causes in 2006.
Acting 1983–1985 – John "Peanuts" Tronolone
1985–1991 – John "Peanuts" Tronolone – died of natural causes in 1991
1991–1993 – Anthony "Tony Lib" Liberatore – imprisoned in 1993, died of natural causes in 1998.
1993–2004 – Joseph "Joe Loose" Iacobacci – retired 
2004–present – Russell "R.J." Papalardo

Underboss
1930–1976 – Anthony Milano – retired in 1976, deceased in 1978.
1976 – Calogero "Leo Lips" Moceri – disappeared and murdered in 1976.
1976–1983 – Angelo "Big Ange" Lonardo – turned informant in October 1983, deceased in 2006.
1983–1985 – John "Peanuts" Tronolone – became boss in 1985.
1985–1991 – Anthony "Tony Lib" Liberatore – became boss.
1991–1995 – Alfred "Allie" Calabrese – imprisoned in 1995.
1995–2004 – Russel "RJ" Papalardo – became boss

Consigliere
1930–1972 – John DeMarco
1972–1973 – Frank "Frankie B" Brancato
1973–1977 – Anthony "Tony Dope" Delsanter
1977–1983 – John "Peanuts" Tronolone – became underboss in 1983.
1983–1993 – Louis "Bones" Battista aka "The Bulldog" (deceased)
1993–1996 – Theodore "Sonny" Sutula (deceased)
1999–2010 – Raymond "Lefty" LaMarca (deceased 2010)

Current members
Made members
Boss – Russell "R.J." Papalardo 

Associates
James Martino
John DiMariangeli
Craig DiFilippo
Ronald Lucarelli, Jr.
Russell Massetta
Carmine Minardi
Anthony Vollatta

Former members
Ronald "Ronnie the Crab" Carabbia – former leader of the Youngstown faction for the family. He died in December 2021.
Pasquale Cisternino – died in 1990.
Joseph Iacobacci – powerful member of the family, serving as boss from 1993 to 2005. Iacobacci was able to partially rebuild the family, with the help of the Chicago Outfit. He died in April 2020.
Milton "Maishe" Rockman – former associate, Rockman was a Jewish-American organized crime figure affiliated with the Cleveland crime family. Rockman was the brother-in-law of Cleveland crime family bosses John T. Scalish and Angelo Lonardo, and was a top Cleveland crime family associate involved in labor racketeering and the Las Vegas casino interests of the Cleveland Mafia.

References
Notes

Citations

Bibliography

 
Organizations established in 1920
1920 establishments in Ohio
Organizations based in Cleveland
Italian-American crime families
Gangs in Ohio
Crime in Cleveland
Italian-American culture in Cleveland